Quảng Phú may refer to several places in Vietnam, including:

, a ward of Quảng Ngãi city
Quảng Phú, Đắk Lắk, a township and capital of Cư M'gar District
, a rural commune of Thanh Hóa city, Thanh Hóa Province
, a rural commune of Lương Tài District
, a rural commune of Krông Nô District
Quảng Phú, Quảng Bình, a rural commune of Quảng Trạch District
, a rural commune of Thọ Xuân District, Thanh Hóa Province
, a rural commune of Quảng Điền District

See also
Quang Phú, a rural commune of Đồng Hới